The Little Office of the Passion refers to a devotional office created by Francis of Assisi as a complement to the Divine Office of the Roman Catholic Church.

Organization

Order

The Little Office of the Passion is organized in a way reminiscent of the Liturgy of the Hours. It begins with the Our Father followed by the Glory Be. After these, a series of praises composed by Francis of Assisi is recited. Then the appropriate psalm is read, framed by an antiphon to the Blessed Virgin Mary also composed by Francis. After the psalm is read and the antiphon is repeated, a dismissal concludes the Office.

Our Father
Glory Be
Praises
Antiphon
Psalm
Antiphon
Dismissal

The text of the praises is as follows:

The text of the antiphon:

The Passion of Jesus

The Little Office of the Passion follows a pattern constructed by Francis of Assisi. He ordered this office around the medieval association of five specific moments in Jesus' Passion with specific hours of the day. Having then attributed these to hours of the Divine Office (This Little Office being recited following the Canonical Office), he arrived at this schema:

 Compline - 21:00 - Jesus' Arrest on the Mount of Olives
 Lauds (preceded by Matins) - 00:00 - Jesus' Trial before the Jewish Sanhedrin
 Prime - 06:00 - "an interlude celebrating Christ as the light of the new day"
 Terce - 09:00 - Jesus' Trial before Pontius Pilate
 Sext - 12:00 - Jesus' Crucifixion
 None - 15:00 - Jesus' Death
 Vespers - 18:00 - "recalling and celebrating the entire daily cycle"

Psalms

The Psalms used in the Little Office of the Passion are not individual psalms from the Hebrew Scriptures, but are collages constructed by Francis of Assisi by taking passages from canticles, psalms, liturgical texts, and other sources to paint pictures of the scenes from the Passion of Jesus.

Sequences of the Office

The Psalms are organized into five sequences corresponding to the Liturgical Year of the Roman Catholic Church. The sequences are as follows:

Psalm texts

The texts of the Psalms are as follow:

Psalm 1

Psalm 2

Psalm 3

Psalm 4

Psalm 5

Psalm 6

Psalm 7

Psalm 8

Psalm 9

Psalm 10

Psalm 11

Psalm 12

Psalm 13

Psalm 14

Psalm 15

References

Catholic devotions